Balázs Berdó (born 25 May 1982, in Pécs) is a retired Hungarian football (midfielder) player.

Digenis Morphou 
In 2006, Balázs Berdó was recruited as right midfielder by the Cypriot team Digenis Morphou and this move was possible due to the effort input by Mr Kosta Christodoulou.

References 
HLSZ
eufo
uefa
footballmasters
Pecs MFC

External links 
 

1982 births
Living people
Sportspeople from Pécs
Hungarian footballers
Hungary under-21 international footballers
Association football midfielders
Hungarian expatriate footballers
Pécsi MFC players
Kozármisleny SE footballers
Expatriate footballers in Cyprus
Cypriot First Division players
Digenis Akritas Morphou FC players
Hungarian expatriate sportspeople in Cyprus
Budapest Honvéd FC players